Dalkoz is a village in the Bayramören District of Çankırı Province in Turkey. Its population is 112 (2021).

References

Villages in Bayramören District